Group B of the 2014 Toulon Tournament is one of two groups competing of nations at 2014 Toulon Tournament.

Standings

All Times are Central European Summer Time (CEST)

Brazil vs South Korea

England vs Qatar

South Korea vs Qatar

Brazil vs Colombia

Colombia vs South Korea

England vs Brazil

Colombia vs Qatar

England vs South Korea

England vs Colombia

Brazil vs Qatar

External links
 

B
2013–14 in English football
2014 in Colombian football
2013–14 in Qatari football
2014 in Brazilian football
2014 in South Korean football